Badao  is a village in the Bassar Prefecture in the Kara Region  of north-western Togo. It is located 229 mi or ( 369 km ) North of Lomé , the country's capital .

References

Populated places in Kara Region
Bassar Prefecture